Victory Glacier is a gently sloping glacier, 8 nautical miles (15 km) long, flowing east-southeast from the north end of Detroit Plateau on Trinity Peninsula to Prince Gustav Channel immediately north of Pitt Point. Bounded by Trakiya Heights to the north and Kondofrey Heights to the south.  It was surveyed by the Falkland Islands Dependencies Survey (FIDS), and so named because the glacier was sighted in the week following the surrender of Japan in World War II, in August 1945.

See also
 List of glaciers in the Antarctic
 Glaciology

Map
 Trinity Peninsula. Scale 1:250000 topographic map No. 5697. Institut für Angewandte Geodäsie and British Antarctic Survey, 1996.

References

External links
 SCAR Composite Antarctic Gazetteer.

Glaciers of Trinity Peninsula